Grabo is a surname. Notable people with the surname include:

Anto Grabo (born 1960), Yugoslavian-born Hong Kong footballer of Croatian descent
Edith Grabo, East German slalom canoer
Paul Grabö (1918–2002), Swedish politician